Keith Lemon's Very Brilliant World Tour is a travel-style comedy series hosted by Keith Lemon, a character portrayed by comedian Leigh Francis. The series was first announced during an appearance by Lemon on the Big Brother companion show Big Brother's Big Mouth in 2007. The show premiered on 11 March 2008, attracting 565,000 viewers (a 2.2% multi-channel share), and concluded on 15 April 2008.

Format
The series features Lemon travelling around the world on a shark-shaped flight plan, visiting six countries (Australia, Japan, the United States, Egypt, Mexico and Iceland), and meeting various celebrity guests, including: former Spice Girls Mel B and Melanie C, along the way. During the series, Paddy McGuinness played the role of Lemon's cousin Gary.

Production
In May 2008, Francis announced that he would not be filming a second series in the near future, as he would be busy filming his panel show Celebrity Juice commencing in August 2008. The show was released on DVD on 3 November 2008. Francis announced in May 2011 that he would like to write and record a second series, but said he would struggle to find the time to do so.

Episodes

References

External links

2000s British comedy television series
2008 British television series debuts
2008 British television series endings
British travel television series
English-language television shows
ITV comedy